Gun Sword is a 2005 Japanese anime series produced by AIC A.S.T.A, written by Hideyuki Kurata, and directed by Gorō Taniguchi. The series aired on TV Tokyo from July 4 to December 26, 2005, totaling 26 episodes. The series was licensed for North America by Geneon Entertainment, who produced an English dub overseen by New Generation Pictures. The dub is also available in Australia from Madman Entertainment and in the United Kingdom by MVM Films. At Anime Central 2010, North American anime distributor Funimation announced that they have rescued Gun X Sword and re-released the series in late 2010.

The opening theme is "GUNXSWORD" by Kōtarō Nakagawa while the ending themes are "A Rising Tide" by Shuntarō Okino (episodes 1 to 8, 10, 12 to 16, 18 to 21, 23, 25), "Paradiso" by Hitomi (episodes 9 and 11), "S.O.S" by Kikuko Inoue, Houko Kuwashima, Satsuki Yukino & Saeko Chiba (episode 17), "A Rising Tide" (acoustic version) by Shuntaro Okino (episode 22), "Calling You" by Shuntaro Okino (episode 24), and "GUNXSWORD" (starting again) by Kotaro Nakagawa and Ondekoza (episode 26). The insert songs are "Niji no Kanata" by Satsuki Yukino (episode 3) and "La Speranza" by Hitomi (episodes 16, 25).


Episode list

References

Gun Sword